The western red-backed vole (Myodes californicus) is a species of vole in the family Cricetidae. It is found in California and Oregon in the United States and lives mainly in coniferous forest. The body color is chestnut brown, or brown mixed with a considerable quantity of black hair gradually lightening on the sides and grading into a buffy-gray belly, with an indistinct reddish stripe on the back and a bicolored tail about half as long as the head and body.

Taxonomy
The western red-backed vole was initially described by C. Hart Merriam under its original scientific name Evotomys californicus.  The type specimen was obtained at near Eureka, California.  It was an adult male collected by Theodore Sherman Palmer on June 3, 1889.

Description

The height ranges between 0.75–0.87 inches (18–21 mm).

The species is closely related to the southern red-backed vole (Myodes gapperi), which lives to the north and east of the range of this species, and is redder, with a more sharply bicolored tail. They are differentiated based on a reddish stripe on the dorsum of the western red-backed vole.  The western red-backed vole also has characteristic differences in the anatomy of the hard palate.

Distribution and habitat
It is found in northern California and western Oregon in the United States. The range extends from the summits of the Cascade Range in the east, to the Pacific Ocean. They live mainly in coniferous forest. They live in the Transition and Canadian life zones, described by Vernon Orlando Bailey in The mammals and life zones of Oregon.

Behavior and ecology
The western red-backed vole lives largely underground in an extensive system of burrows.  It feeds primarily on fruiting bodies of hypogeous fungi.  These mycorrhizal fungi are the symbionts of the forest trees around it. Rhizopogon vinicolor is one such which is associated with the Douglas-fir (Pseudotsuga spp.). Fruiting of the fungus takes place in well decayed timber when the nutrients are becoming exhausted. Because the fruiting bodies are underground, the spores are not liberated into the air as in most fungal species. However, the spores are found in the vole's droppings and are deposited throughout its burrows, thus enabling the fungus to spread and form associations with uninfected trees. It has been found that in a clear-cut forest where all the dead wood and trimmings are removed, the mycorrhiza stops fruiting, the vole population dies out and newly planted trees fail to thrive. This is an example of a three way symbiosis. The vole gains food from the fungus and spreads its spores. The fungus gains photosynthetic products from the tree which benefits from the nutrients produced by the fungus.

The western red-backed vole, as a denizen of old-growth forests, it plays an important role as prey to a number of species.  For the northern spotted owl, western red-backed voles are one of the top five prey species.  The red tree vole,  northern flying squirrel, and western red-backed vole constitute more than 75% of the spotted owls diet.

The diet of the vole varies depending on its environment.  At higher elevations, they are exposed to a broader differential of climatic conditions.  They eat a more varied diet under such conditions, compared to what they eat under more moderate conditions at lower elevations.

No fossil remains have been identified.

The species breeds between February and November on the slopes of the Cascade Range in north Oregon, as well as all year to the west of the Cascade Range, with 2–7 young per litter and a gestation period of around 18 days.

Human Interaction

Conservation status
According to the IUCN, the species conservation status is of "least concern."  The rationale is that no major threats are identified to this common animal with a widely distributed geographic range.

Biomonitoring
In areas where vole populations live in close proximity to industrial areas, voles are used as a biological indicator to monitor environmental contamination, especially persistent organic pollutants such as PCBs which build up in the vole's fatty tissues.

References 

Western red-backed vole
Mammals of the United States
Rodents of North America
Western red-backed vole
Mammals described in 1890
Taxonomy articles created by Polbot
Taxa named by Clinton Hart Merriam